Malek Ashtar University of Technology (MUT)
is a public research university of engineering, science in Iran. Founded in 1984, MUT's main campus is located at Tehran, the capital of Iran. Its other campuses are located in Isfahan and Urmia. The university is named after Malik al-Ashtar, one of the most loyal companions of Ali Ibn Abi Talib.

MUT provides both undergraduate and graduate programs. It is organized into more than twenty schools, colleges, and institutes, located in six centers throughout Lavizan in Tehran, Shahin Shahr in Isfahan province, Karaj in Alborz province, Fereydunkenar in Mazandaran province, Bandar Abbas in Hormozgan province and Urmia.

History
In late 1981, the Iranian government brought together all military-industrial units and placed them under the Defense Industries Organization (DIO). By 1984, a large number of infantry rifles, machine guns, and mortars and some small-arms ammunition were being manufactured locally. They also established three universities to educate experts for Iran's industrial and research centers: Imam Hossein University, Baqiyatallah Medical Sciences University, and Malek Ashtar University. Malek Ashtar University of Technology was approved in 1984 by the Iranian Ministry of Science, Research and Technology. It was then recognized as a university in 1984.

Campuses

MUT had only one campus in Shahinshahr, Isfahan. In 1999, another campus was established in Tehran and known as main campus. Its faculties include aerospace engineering, applied sciences, electrical engineering, management and industrial engineering, marine sciences and engineering, materials and manufacturing technologies and information, communications and security technologies, and rector as of 2006.

Research

Aerospace research 

Malek Ashtar University of Technology is among top five public universities in Iran that provide aerospace research and programs at undergraduate and postgraduate levels. (These universities includes K. N. Toosi University of Technology, Sharif University of Technology, Amirkabir University of Technology, and Malek Ashtar University of Technology. The Sharif University of Technology was the first university with an Aerospace Engineering degree since 1987. The K.N. Toosi University of Technology offered Ph.D. in Aerospace Engineering in a joint program with Moscow State Aviation Technological University in Russia.

In 2003, Iranian Space Agency was established in an uninhabited desert area in Semnan Province, southeast of Tehran. The Aerospace Research Institute affiliated to the Ministry of Science, Research and Technology is active organization in the space science and technology applications. Five public universities, one private university (Azad University Science and Research Branch), and one college (Civil Aviation Technology College) provide higher education and research in aerospace engineering.

Since the 1990s, Iran started to develop a launch vehicle based on Shahab-3. The Iran Space Research Center started testing launch capabilities since early 2007 reaching 150–200 km altitude based on Shahab-3 series. In 2008, they developed a two-stage launch vehicle Safir-1. In 2009, they launched a satellite named Omid into orbit using the domestically built launch vehicle Safir-2, making Iran the ninth nation capable of producing and launching a satellite.

Biological research 

According to the Center for Strategic and International Studies (CSIS) report on the biological activities in Iran, genetic cloning is being carried out at the Malek Ashtar University of Technology.
The Iran's activities about biological weapons began in 1985. By 1986, they established a research center in Tehran's Pasteur Institute to work on toxic fungus and microbial substances. The center succeeded in producing toxic fungus, and aflatoxin. In 1987, they moved the facilities to the Imam Hossein University.

A number of foreign experts from China, North Korea, India, and Russia have cooperated with the Ministry of Defense of Iran.
The Research Center for Direct Biotechnology, which does not directly work on microbial weapons, is used as the center for biological researches and actively works with the Malek Ashtar University of Technology, Imam Hossein University, and Baqiyatallah Medical Sciences University. However, the Centers for Science and Technological Growth of the Biological Research Center of the Malek Ashtar University of Technology, affiliated with the defense industries, are in charge of mass production of biological weapons.

Academics

Schools and colleges
The main campus located in Tehran include:

 Materials and Manufacturing Technologies Complex
 Electrical and Electronics Engineering Complex
 Management and Industrial Engineering Complex
 Communications and Security Technologies Complex
 Modern Sciences and Technologies Complex
 Non-factor Defense Institute
 Aerospace Department

Shahinshahr campus include:

 Applied Sciences Complex
 Marine Science and Technology Complex
 School of Aerospace and Mechanical Engineering
 School of Material Engineering
 School of Electrical and Electronics Engineering
 School of Industrial Engineering
 School of Marine Science and Engineering

MUT has two libraries, the Dr Chamran library on the Shahinshahr campus, and the Khawrazmi library on the Tehran campus.

The university also co-operates with several independent research centers. Among those:

Atomic Energy Organization of Iran (AEOI)
Ministry of Defense of Iran
Amirkabir University of Technology
Sharif University of Technology
University of Tehran
University of Science and Defense Technologies (USDT)
Baltic State Technical University (until 1998)
China Aerospace Science and Technology Corporation
Centers for Science and Technological Growth
Biological Research Center of Malek Ashtar University
Research Center for Direct Biotechnology
Sina Industry (Vira Laboratories)
Aerospace Industries Organization (AIO)
Biological Research Center of SIO
Damghan's Weapons Industry
National Center for Genetic Engineering and Biotechnology Research
The Institute of Biochemistry and Biophysics (IBB)
Tehran's Biochemical and Bioenvironmental Research Center
Group of Fermentation and Biological Technology
Missile Industrial Group at Parchin
Shahid Babaye Industrial Complex (SBIC)
Mechanical Systems Industrial Group (MIG)
Special Industrial Groups of the Ministry of Defense (MIDSPCIG)

Admissions
Admission in MUT is highly competitive and only top students may achieve this honor and all undergraduate and graduate programs requires scoring among top 1% of students in the Iranian University Entrance Exam, known as Concours (from the French; Konkoor, Konkour, and Konkur are transliterations of the Persian).

Rankings

According to Ministry of Defense and Armed Forces Logistics policy there is no reliable source of MUT's researches, citations, teaching and industry income for international ranking systems.
Top Ranks in the research tournament in Iran indicate that this university has a high scientific level.
However, according to the evaluation of technical universities in Iran by ISC(Islamic World Science Citation Center), this university was ranked 8 in 2015-2016 and in 2016-2020 ranked 6-10 among all the technical universities of Iran.
In the ranking of world universities by SCimago Institutions Rankings, this university has been ranked 700, 773, 830 ,793and 721 in 2018, 2019, 2020,2021 and 2022, respectively.
According to the results of the World Rankings in 2022 by SCimago Institutions Rankings, the world ranking of this university in research is 465 and is in Biochemistry, Genetics and Molecular Biology(813th), Business, Management and Accounting(878th),Chemistry( 792nd), Computer Science(735th),Earth and Planetary Sciences(365th),Energy(576th),Engineering(588th),Aerospace Engineering(507th),Industrial and Manufacturing Engineering(707th),Mechanical Engineering(626th),Environmental Science( 564th),Mathematics(680th),Pharmacology, Toxicology and Pharmaceutics(926th),Physics and Astronomy(596th).
In the ranking of world universities by CWTS Leiden Ranking in 2020(Time period:2015–2018), it has been ranked 1055.
In the ranking of world universities by CWTS Leiden Ranking in 2021(Time period:2016–2019), it has been ranked 1077.
 The global ranking of Malek-Ashtar University of Technology in the field of engineering in 2021 in CWTS Leiden Ranking is 481 and in SCimago Institutions Rankings is 523.
According to the results of the World Rankings in 2022 by EduRank institute(https://edurank.org/uni/malek-ashtar-university-of-technology/rankings/), the world ranking of this university in the fields of Metallurgical Engineering,Nuclear Engineering,Marine Engineering,Chemical Engineering,Materials Science,Aviation and, Aerospace Engineeringis 525, 556, 689, 878, 888, 928 and, 1000,respectively.
In the 2020 assessment of the Essential Science Indicators (ESI) belonging to Clarivate Analytics (ISI), Malek-Ashtar University of Technology ranked among the top 1% universities of the world with the most impact based on citations.

Student life

Residential life
In addition to the sports teams, fraternities, sororities, and study clubs, there are many organizations on campus that focus on entertainment, arts, and culture.

Groups and activities
MUT has many scientific societies include:
 Language Scientific Society
 Physics Scientific Society
 Chemistry Scientific Society
 Password and Encryption Scientific Society
 Astronomy Scientific Society
 Marine Engineering Scientific Society
 Materials Engineering Scientific Society
 Scientific Society of Mechanical Engineering
 Scientific Society of Aerospace Engineering
 Scientific Society of Optical Engineering
 Information Technology Scientific Society
 Electrical and Electronic Engineering Scientific Society

The Materials Engineering Scientific Society selected as the best national scientific Society by Ministry of Science, Research and Technology in 2009, 2010 and 2011. Also, MUT Physics Scientific Society was honored in Harkat National Festival and selected as a third center of excellence in Iran Scientific Society of Physics.

Athletics
MUT students compete in club and intramural sports, including soccer, volleyball, basketball, badminton, tennis and ping pong. A wide variety of sports facilities are available at Malek Ashtar University of Technology. The Sports and Recreation Center serves various facilities and fields throughout both Isfahan and Tehran campuses to athletic teams.

Sanctions
The United Nations, the European Union and American officials believe the university is involved in the nuclear program of Iran and that it has served as a cover for the organization responsible for the manufacturing of nuclear warheads. The university is not open to visitors and inspectors of the International Atomic Energy Agency have not been allowed to interview staff. The university has been under sanctions from the United Nations and from the European Union. This only includes research groups previously falling under the Physics Research Center (PHRC)  subordinate to the Atomic Energy Organization of Iran. Exiled Iranian opposition groups have claimed the university has assisted in developing biological weapons.

Notable faculty and alumni

Ardeshir Hosseinpour
Darioush Rezaeinejad
Shahram Amiri
Mohammad Reza Aref
Ali Mohammadi

See also
List of universities in Iran
Iranian Space Agency
Defense Industries Organization
Iran Aviation Industries Organization
Nuclear program of Iran

References 

Universities in Iran
Universities in Tehran
Education in Isfahan
Universities in Isfahan Province
Educational institutions established in 1986
Engineering universities and colleges in Iran
1986 establishments in Iran
Buildings and structures in Isfahan
Education in Urmia